Gregory E. Stinson, better known as G. E. Stinson (born in Kingfisher, Oklahoma), is an American guitarist and founding member of new age/electronic musical group Shadowfax. Inspired by blues masters such as Bo Diddley and Muddy Waters, Stinson experimented with blues, jazz and other musical genres before co-founding Shadowfax in 1974. He remained with the band for six albums. He departed Shadowfax after recording The Odd Get Even (1989), entering the Los Angeles underground music community to refine his 'extended technique' and 'frequency manipulation'. Since then he has worked with a number of musicians on various  projects, including Napalm Quartet, Splinter Group, Stinkbug, Metalworkers, Alex De Grassi, Devin Sarno and others. In 2000, he collaborated with drummer Gregg Bendian, violinist Jeff Gauthier, and bassist Steuart Liebig on an album of collective improvisational pieces recorded live in the studio, entitled Bone Structure. Released in 2003, it was given four stars by Jim Andrews in DownBeat magazine.

Stinson is a long-time Zen-practitioner.

Discography
  The Same Without You (Nine Winds, 1992)
  Thousand Other Names (Birdcage, 1996)
  Vapor (Ecstatic Peace!, 1999)
  The Other Shore  with Alex Cline, Jeff Gauthier (Cryptogramophone, 2000)
 Shortwave Postcard with Alex de Grassi, (Auditorium, 2001)
  Bone Structure  with Gregg Bendian, Jeff Gauthier, and Steuart Liebig (Cryptogramophone, 2003)

With Alex Cline
 Right of Violet (1995)
 Sparks Fly Upward (1999)
 The Constant Flame (2001)
 For People in Sorrow (Cryptogramophone, 2013)

With Nels Cline
 Destroy All Nels Cline (Atavistic, 2001)
 Elevating Device (Sounds Are Active, 2009)

With Shadowfax
 1976 Watercourse Way
 1982 Shadowfax
 1983 Shadowdance
 1985 The Dreams of Children
 1986 Too Far to Whisper
 1987 Folksongs for a Nuclear Village
 1990 The Odd Get Even

With The Choir Boys
 2006 The Choir Boys With Strings

References

Year of birth missing (living people)
Living people
People from Kingfisher, Oklahoma
Guitarists from Oklahoma
American blues guitarists
American male guitarists
Shadowfax (band) members